Karimabad, formerly known as Baltit,  is the capital of Hunza District, in the Gilgit-Baltistan province of Pakistan. An article on The Guardian ranked it as one of the five "Best Tourist Sites" in Pakistan.

Etymology
Karimabad was named in honour of Prince Karim Aga Khan, the current spiritual head of Shia Ismaili Nizari community, though locals often still refer to Karimabad by its older name Baltit.

Geography 

Karimabad town, located on the west bank of the Hunza River, is in the Northern Areas of the Pakistan, in a valley which is at  elevation. The town is made up of stone walled steep sloping large terraces. The town was a caravan halting place for people who were traveling through the Hindu Kush mountains to the Vale of Kashmir. It is set amidst snow clad mountain peaks of Rakaposhi (altitude of about ), and glaciers like the Ulter Nala as a backdrop, and deep gorges. Access is by hill road from Gilgit.

Flora and fauna 
The floral vegetation in the wild consist of roses, pansies, lilies, zinnias, and cosmos, along with trees such as apple, apricot, walnut, mulberry, willow, fir, and poplar trees.

The fauna recorded in the village consist of ibex (Capra (genus), duck, red-striped fox, snow leopard (Panthera uncia syn. Uncia uncia), markhor (Capra falconeri) (wild goat), Marco Polo sheep (Ovis ammon polii), and yak (Bos grunniens and Bos mutus).

History 
Karimabad, previously known as Baltit, was originally ruled by a monarch, the Mir of Hunza. The Baltit Fort was built at that time to function as the Mir's palace. The location was known as a caravan resting stop, and for its slave trade.

Baltit served as the capital of Hunza valley for over 750 years, until the middle of the 20th century. After Pakistan became an independent country in 1947, the Hunza province controlled by the Mir voluntarily joined Pakistan. Earlier, the capital had been shifted from the area around Balit down to the lower part of the hills where new buildings were erected, which became the new capital, Karimabad. The new town has developed into a tourist place, following the development of the Karakoram Highway, with a number of shopping complexes dealing in handicrafts, hotels, restaurants, and travel agencies.

Both Baltit Fort and Karimabad village received the World Award of Tourism in 2000 when Indonesia, Australia, India, and Britain and other countries competed.

Demographics 
The population of the town was more than 5,000 in 1992. It had four clans of herdsmen tending livestock. Out of a population of 16,000 (65,000 in the valley) as of 1995, most of the residents of the town and the Hunsa valley are Shia Ismaili Muslims. Literacy in the valley is as high as 90% as against a national average of 58 percent. Residents of the town say that all young people of the town below the age of 30 are literate.

Education 
There was a high school in the town in 1986 itself when the population of the Hunza  valley was 30,000. The town has received substantial assistance from the Aga Khan Foundation, a charitable institution, which is involved in infrastructure activities such as roads and water supply, as well as in establishing educational institutions and health centres. There are also schools for women such as the Aga Khan Higher Secondary School for Girls, and the Hasegawa Memorial Public School run by Japan, which are popular for girls.

Economy 
The economy is dependent on agriculture with crops such as corn (maize), fruits, and vegetables grown under irrigated conditions.

Landmarks 
The landmarks around the town are the Baltit Fort, Queen Victoria Monument, Channel Walk and the snow clad mountains of Rakaposhi and glaciers of Ulter Nala.

Baltit Fort 

Baltit, which was the original capital of the Hunza valley, was established in the 13th century. A fort was built, in the backdrop of snow clad mountains, in the 17th century when Mir Ayesho II's (great-grandson of Girkis, a legendary ruler) wife, the daughter of the Balti ruler, came to live in Hunza. The fort was built in Balti-style by the artisans brought by her. It was refurbished during Ayesho II's son's rule. Mir Nazim Khan got it refurnished with wall paper, curtains, fireplaces, balconies, and windows with tinted glass. The exterior of the fort was given a white wash. He also built a raised platform in the terrace to hold meetings of the council. Once the capital was moved to Karimabad, the fort was stripped of all its interior furnishings and decorations. Nazim Khan's son had moved to Karimabad in 1945.It was a deserted structure in 1984. However, between 1990 and 1996 the fort was completely rebuilt with all structural elements of the old fort to its original plan taking earthquake factor into consideration. The fort presents a view as if it has been newly built but retains all the original features, and commands a scenic view of the Hunza valley. Some of the rooms in the fort have exhibits of dresses and pictures as also some ancient vessels and furniture donated by the local people.

Queen Victoria Monument 
The Queen Victoria Monument is erected on a rock face at the rear end of Karimabad. It can be accessed only by trekking for about an hour passing through irrigation channels, a polo ground, an old watch tower, and a narrow passage strewn with rocks. It is at the base of the rock face and was built by Nazim Khan; in the local Burushaski language it is known "Malikamu Shikari" (ma-li-ka-mu shi-ka-ri).

Channel Walk 
Ultar Nala water channels (seven channels flowing towards the west and five flowing eastward) from the head-works on the nala taking off at different levels are utilized for irrigation, and also as tourist attraction to walk along their route for enjoying the scenic beauty of the Hunza Valley. Some channels pass through the Karimabad town. The water flowing in the channel is also attractive as it has velvety colour caused by the minute content of fine mica particles.

References

Bibliography

External links 

Populated places in Hunza District
Ismailism in Pakistan